1966 Emperor's Cup Final was the 46th final of the Emperor's Cup competition. The final was played at Komazawa Olympic Park Stadium in Tokyo on January 15, 1967. Waseda University won the championship.

Overview
Waseda University won the championship, by defeating defending champion Toyo Industries 3–2. This is last champions team as university team.

Match details

See also
1966 Emperor's Cup

References

Emperor's Cup
Emperor's Cup Final
Emperor's Cup Final
Emperor's Cup Final
Sanfrecce Hiroshima matches